Danylo Ihorovych Kolesnyk (born 22 September 2001) is a Ukrainian professional footballer who plays as a centre-forward for FC Mynai.

References

External links
 
 Profile on fotbalpraha.cz

2001 births
Living people
Place of birth missing (living people)
Ukrainian footballers
Association football forwards
FC Arsenal Kyiv players
FC Vorskla Poltava players
FC Kolos Kovalivka players
FC VPK-Ahro Shevchenkivka players
FC Mynai players
Ukrainian Premier League players
Ukrainian First League players
Ukrainian expatriate sportspeople in the Czech Republic
Ukrainian expatriate footballers
Expatriate footballers in the Czech Republic